State Trunk Highway 121 (often called Highway 121, STH-121 or WIS 121) is a  state highway in Buffalo, Trempealeau, and Jackson counties in the west-central area of the US state of Wisconsin that runs east–west from Gilmanton to near Alma Center.

Route description
Starting at WIS 88 in Gilmanton, WIS 121 starts to travel eastward, passing through Lookout and Russell. Then, WIS 121 turns south along WIS 93. In Independence, WIS 121 leaves eastward away from WIS 93. Then, in Whitehall, WIS 121 begins to run concurrently with US Highway 53 (US 53). They then pass through Coral City. Then, in Pigeon Falls, WIS 121 branches eastward, passing through York and Northfield. In Northfield, it then meets Interstate 94 (I-94) at a diamond interchange. Continuing further east, WIS 121 then ends at WIS 95 west of Alma Center.

Major intersections

See also

References

External links

121
Transportation in Buffalo County, Wisconsin
Transportation in Trempealeau County, Wisconsin
Transportation in Jackson County, Wisconsin